Scopula pinguis is a moth of the family Geometridae first described by Charles Swinhoe in 1902. It is found in Korea, Japan and Taiwan.

References

Moths described in 1902
pinguis
Moths of Asia